The Copyright Act of 1909 was a landmark statute in United States statutory copyright law.  It went into effect on July 1, 1909. The 1909 Act was repealed and superseded by the Copyright Act of 1976, which went into effect on January 1, 1978; but some of 1909 Act's provisions continue to apply to copyrighted works created before 1978. It allowed for works to be copyrighted for a period of 28 years from the date of publication and extended the renewal term from 14 years (effective as of the Copyright Act of 1831) to 28 years, for a maximum of 56 years (in place of the former 42 years).

Background

Before the 1909 Act, the last major revision to United States copyright law was the 1790 Act.  Methods of reproducing and duplicating works subject to copyright had significantly increased since the 1790 Act.  President Theodore Roosevelt expressed the need for a complete revision of copyright law as opposed to amendments, saying in a message to Congress in December 1905, "Our copyright laws urgently need revision. They are imperfect in definition, confused and inconsistent in expression; they omit provision for many articles which, under modern reproductive processes, are entitled to protection; they impose hardships upon the copyright proprietor which are not essential to the fair protection of the public; they are difficult for the courts to interpret and impossible for the Copyright Office to administer with satisfaction to the public."

Under the 1909 Act, federal statutory copyright protection attached to original works only when those works were 1) published and 2) had a notice of copyright affixed. Thus, state copyright law governed protection for unpublished works, but published works, whether containing a notice of copyright or not, were governed exclusively by federal law. If no notice of copyright was affixed to a work and the work was "published" in a legal sense, the 1909 Act provided no copyright protection and the work became part of the public domain.  In the report submitted by the House Committee on Patents, they designed the copyright law "not primarily for the benefit of the author, but primarily for the benefit of the public." The 1976 Act changed this result, providing that copyright protection attaches to works that are original and fixed in a tangible medium of expression, regardless of publication or affixation of notice.

It also created (codified in Section 1(e)) the first compulsory mechanical license to allow anyone to make a mechanical reproduction (known today as a phonorecord) of a musical composition without the consent of the copyright owner provided that the person adhered to the provisions of the license. (Congress intended it to govern piano rolls.) In later practice, compulsory license made it possible to record and distribute a cover version of a hit song –  once a recording had been released, and the copyright owner was served with a notice of intention to use – that directly competed with the original.

Case law

White-Smith Music Publishing Company v. Apollo Company

In February 1908, the Supreme Court ruled that manufacturers of pianola music rolls were not required to pay royalties to composers, based on the holding that these music rolls were not copies of musical compositions within the meaning of copyright law because it was not "a written or printed record in intelligible notation." This decision on sheet music was superseded by the Act.

F. W. Woolworth Co. v. Contemporary Arts, Inc.

In 1952, the Supreme Court held that the Act gave trial judges significant freedom in imposing legal remedies to discourage copyright infringement. Under this ruling, judges could penalize copyright infringers with repaying profits or paying compensation for damages. If damages could not be determined, judges could levy statutory damages instead.

Herbert v. Shanley Co.

On January 22, 1917, Supreme Court Justice Oliver Holmes upheld the right for copyright owners to compensation for a public performance of a musical composition, even if there was no direct charge for admission.  This ruling forced Shanley's Restaurant in New York to pay a fee to songwriter Victor Herbert for playing one of his songs on a player piano during dinner.  This decision helped the ASCAP adopt the royalty-payment mechanism known as a "blanket license", which is still used today. Under a blanket license, signatory businesses such as restaurants have the right to play any composition of an ASCAP artist for an annual fee.

Notable amendments

The Townsend Amendment of 1912
This amendment resulted in motion pictures being specifically added to the category of protected works. Prior to this amendment, United States copyright law did not protect nor register motion picture films.  Instead, most motion picture filmmakers would register their work as a collection of still photographs.

The Act of March 28, 1914
This amendment amended section 12 of the Copyright Act of 1909, allowing foreign authors whose work had been published in a foreign country to submit only one copy of the best edition of their work, rather than the customary two. This helped ease the deposit requirements of foreign authors.

The Act of September 25, 1941
This amended section 8 of the Copyright Act of 1909 with the intention to preserve the right of authors during periods of emergency, and specifically for World War II.  The purpose of this amendment was to prevent authors, copyright owners, or proprietors from losing the opportunity to acquire or preserve copyright protection for their works because of the disruption of communication or suspension of facilities where they could acquire copyright licenses because of the war.

See also
 United States Copyright Law
 Copyright Act of 1790
 Copyright Act of 1831
 Copyright Act of 1976
 Berne Convention for the Protection of Literary and Artistic Works
 List of copyright case law

References

Bibliography

"Act of March 4, 1909 (in effect July 1, 1909)." Copyright Law of the United States. Copyright.gov, 2012. Web. 8 Jan. 2012. <http://www.copyright.gov/history/1909act.pdf>.

External links 

United States federal copyright legislation
1909 in law